Indian Immunologicals Limited (IIL) is a subsidiary of National Dairy Development Board. It is based in Hyderabad, Telangana, India. IIL is registered in India as a Public Limited Company under the Companies Act, 1956 (Ministry of Corporate Affairs – MCA Services), It was established in 1982 by the National Dairy Development Board.

It is noted for developing veterinary and human vaccines for foot-and-mouth disease, rabies, bacterial vaccines, canine vaccines, hepatitis, measles, MMR and DPT.

IIL is a major supplier of DPT, TT and Hepatitis B vaccines to India's large Universal Immunization Programme. IIL has three vaccine manufacturing facilities in India. The Gachibowli-Hyderabad facility is engaged in the production of vaccines, while the Karakapatla-Hyderabad facility produces animal health formulations and human vaccines. IIL's facility in Ooty exclusively produces human anti-rabies vaccine, "Abhayrab". Pristine Biologicals Ltd is IIL's subsidiary in New Zealand and is involved in the production of serum used in the manufacture of vaccines.

Animal Health 
IIL manufactures animal health vaccines and formulations.  IIL is the third largest animal health player in the Indian market and the market leader in veterinary biologicals in India. IIL operates one plant that is WHO-GMP and ISO-9001, 14001, 18001 and 27001 certified.  IIL also introduced the world's first vaccine against Porcine Cysticercosis –Cysvax. IIL is the only producer of companion animal vaccines in India.

Human Health 

IIL operates a manufacturing facility in Ooty to manufacture the Vero cell culture rabies vaccine for use in human beings. This plant was set up in 1998 at the specific request of the Government of India in order to phase out use of the older and unsafe sheep brain vaccine (also termed nerve tissue vaccine – NTV) with the modern tissue culture vaccine.

The plant, which commenced commercial production in phases from September 2006, meets a large part of the requirements of the Universal Immunization Programme of the Ministry of Health, Govt of India.

Human Biologicals Institute 
IIL established Human Biologicals Institute (HBI) in 1999 to manufacture modern Tissue Culture Anti Rabies Vaccine (TCARV) for human use at Ooty, Tamil Nadu.

International Business 
IIL exports its products to more than 50 countries across the world with a customer focus in Middle East, Asia, Africa, CISR countries and expanding in Central and Latin America.

Coronavirus Vaccine Development 
Immunologicals Limited (IIL) is developing a vaccine for coronavirus in a cross-continental collaboration. It is leading the cross-continental research collaboration in association with the Griffith University of Australia to develop 'live attenuated SARS-CoV-2 Vaccine or COVID-19 vaccine' using the latest codon de-optimization technology.

See also
Genome Valley

References

Research institutes in Hyderabad, India
Health care companies of India
Biotechnology companies of India
1983 establishments in Andhra Pradesh
Pharmaceutical companies established in 1983
Government-owned companies of India
Biotechnology companies established in 1983